Daitingichthys is an extinct genus of prehistoric bony fish that lived during the early Toarcian stage of the Early Jurassic epoch.

References

Clupeiformes
Early Jurassic fish